Toby Elder (17 October 1934 – 20 April 2005) was  a former Australian rules footballer who played with Fitzroy in the Victorian Football League (VFL).

Notes

External links 

1934 births
2005 deaths
Australian rules footballers from Victoria (Australia)
Fitzroy Football Club players